The women's 400 metres hurdles at the 2015 World Championships in Athletics was held at the Beijing National Stadium on 23, 24 and 26 August.

Summary
Zuzana Hejnová of the Czech Republic entered the competition as the defending champion.

Through these championships Cassandra Tate had been the #1 qualifier in the heats and #2 in the semi-finals, earning her a center lane position next to #1 qualifier, the defending champion Hejnová.  The world leader coming into the event was World Junior Champion Shamier Little.  While Little had been almost mechanical in winning the NCAA Championships, the US Championships and the Pan American Games over a long season, in this championship she struggled through the rounds, the slowest qualifier in both.  Her slow time in the semi relegated her to the inside lane, lane 2 on Beijing's 9 lane track.	
In the finals, those were the players, with Hejnová in a clear lead by the final turn, with Little and Tate chasing.  Hejnová just continued to build her lead unchallenged to the finish, as Little struggled over hurdle 8, stretching to 9 and again awkward at 10.  Still Little's strength was able to beat Tate to the line for silver.  Sara Petersen made a late rush at Tate coming into the 10th hurdle, but Tate carried her momentum better into the finish to claim bronze.

Records
Prior to the competition, the records were as follows:

Qualification standards

Schedule

Results

Heats
Qualification: Best 4 (Q) and next 4 fastest (q) qualify for the next round.

Semifinals
Qualification: Best 2 (Q) and next 2 fastest (q) qualify for the next round.

Final
The final was started at 20:10.

References

400 metres hurdles
400 metres hurdles at the World Athletics Championships
2015 in women's athletics